Jeddo is a borough in Luzerne County, Pennsylvania, United States. As of the 2020 census, the population was 109, making it the least populous borough in the county.

Origin of the name
The Pennsylvania village was originally known as "Japan-Jeddo," after the Japanese port of Edo (anglicized to Jeddo, Japan). When it was incorporated as a Pennsylvania borough (on October 23, 1871), it was renamed "Jeddo." However, some people still referred to it as "Japan-Jeddo." This unofficial name was used up until the 1941 surprise attack on Pearl Harbor, which triggered the United States to enter World War II. After the Japanese attack, the locals dropped the unofficial name ("Japan-Jeddo") and only referred to it as "Jeddo."

Geography
 
Jeddo is located at  (40.994525, -75.899052).

Jeddo uses the Freeland zip code of 18224.

Demographics

As of the census of 2010, there were 98 people living in the borough. According to the 2000 Census, the population density was 474.9 people per square mile (185.3/km²). There were 66 housing units at an average density of 217.7 per square mile (84.9/km²). The racial makeup of the borough was 98.61% White, and 1.39% from two or more races.

There were 43 households, out of which 36.1% had children under the age of 18 living with them, 62.8% were married couples living together, 18.6% had a female householder with no husband present, and 37.2% were non-families. 36.1% of all households were made up of individuals, and 13.1% had someone living alone who was 65 years of age or older. The average household size was 2.36 and the average family size was 3.15.

In the borough the population was spread out, with 27.1% under the age of 18, 10.4% from 18 to 24, 34.0% from 25 to 44, 19.4% from 455 to 64, and 9.0% who were 65 years of age or older. The median age was 30 years. For every 100 females, there were 118.2 males. For every 100 females age 18 and over, there were 114.3 males.

The median income for a household in the borough was $20,436, and the median income for a family was $53,750. Males had a median income of $21,628 versus $13,750 for females. The per capita income for the borough was $14,776. There were none of the families and 7.6% of the population living below the poverty line, including no under eighteens and 100.0% of those over 64.

See also
 Jeddo, Japan

References

Populated places established in 1871
Municipalities of the Anthracite Coal Region of Pennsylvania
Boroughs in Luzerne County, Pennsylvania
1871 establishments in Pennsylvania